The Jewish presence in Taiwan began in the mid-20th century, and was never numerous. The first sizable presence began in the 1950s, when religious services were held in the United States military chapel, to which civilians also had access.  There are currently two main entities for Jews in Taiwan, the Jeffrey D. Schwartz Jewish Community Center of Taiwan and the Taiwan Jewish Community.

Rabbinical services
In the 1950s Jewish religious services were held in the United States military chapel on  Zhongshan North Road with services being open to both military families and civilians.

In 1975, Rabbi Ephraim Einhorn arrived to serve as the island's sole rabbi. Formally established as a non-profit organization in 1977, the Taiwan Jewish Community has been largely made up of foreign business executives and their families, students, diplomats assigned to Taiwan, and visitors to the island. For many years Rabbi Einhorn officiated at Sabbath and holiday services at the Landis Hotel and later the Sheraton Taipei. In 2015 the venue for the services moved to space in an office building provided by one of the community members. In 2020 the Taiwan Jewish Community moved to a location funded by the entire community. Attendance peaks around the High Holy Days, numbering between 60 and 100. Rabbi Einhorn died in 2021 in Taipei and his role in running the organization Taiwan Jewish Community was passed on to Leon Fenster.

Jeffrey D. Schwartz Jewish Community Center of Taiwan
On December 29, 2021, the Jeffrey D. Schwartz Jewish Community Center of Taiwan was officially opened. The 22,500 square-foot center features a synagogue, mikveh (ritual bath), kosher culinary lab and kitchen, 300-person ballroom, classroom, library, and a museum of Judaica and Jewish art containing over 400 rare items. The center was funded, designed, and built by the Jeffrey D. Schwartz & NaTang Jewish Taiwan Cultural Association (JTCA), a non-profit organization founded by Jeffrey D. Schwartz, Founder and CEO of Four Star Group, and his wife NaTang, an actress, musician, and author. The center offers a variety of cultural activities and is open to membership and participation by everyone in the Taiwan community, including those who adhere to other faiths.

Relations with Israel
Because the state of Israel has full diplomatic relations with mainland China, it cannot fully recognize the government of Taiwan, which China considers separatist. Nevertheless, Israel maintains the Israel Economic and Cultural Office in Taipei (ISECO). In 2006, there was $1.3 billion worth of bilateral trade between Israel and Taiwan.

In 2023 Ashkenazi Chief Rabbi of Israel David Lau visited Taiwan.

Holocaust related

In 2002 a Holocaust Museum was opened in Bao'an, Rende Township, Tainan County (now part of Tainan City).
It was founded by Chou Chou An, a Taiwanese priest who follows Messianic Judaism, considered by many Christians and Jews to be a form of Christianity. Chou Chou An received his religious education in Japan. The Kyoto Holocaust Museum has donated several artefacts to the Holocaust Museum in Tainan.

In 2021 an International Holocaust Remembrance Day ceremony in Taipei was attended by Taiwanese President Tsai Ing-wen. The event was organized by the Israel Economic and Cultural Office in Taipei, the German Institute Taipei, and the Taiwan Foundation for Democracy.

Chabad Taiwan

In the summer of 2011, upon the coming of the new Chabad emissaries, Rabbi Shlomi and Racheli Tabib, the Chabad Taiwan, also known as the Taipei Jewish Center, was founded.

Population

As of 2016 the Jewish community in Taiwan numbered approximately 800, with 650 of those residing in Taipei.

See also
Ephraim Einhorn

References

External links
Jeffrey D. Schwartz Jewish Community Center of Taiwan
Taiwan Jewish Community
Taipei Jewish Center
Taiwan Holocaust Museum

Ethnic groups in Taiwan
 
J